Interactive Broadcast Media, Inc. (IBMI) is a Philippine radio network based in San Juan, Metro Manila, Philippines.

History
IBMI was established in 1996 by broadcast veteran Roberto Bacsal and businessman Rene Palma as a media outlet for the then-newly acquired DWWW. Back then, its offices were located at #23 E. Rodriguez Sr. Ave, Quezon City.

In 2010, Antonio "Tonyboy" Cojuangco Jr. acquired a non-controlling share of IBMI and transferred ownership of ABC Development Corporation's former radio stations, collectively known as Dream FM Network, into the former.

In November 2011, IBMI moved to its new home in Atlanta Center, San Juan, Metro Manila after Radio Mindanao Network took over DWWW's operations. In 2012, RMN's parent company, EDCanoy Prime Holdings, acquired 49% of IBMI.

On March 7, 2016, Philippine President Benigno C. Aquino III signed Republic Act No. 10753 which renewed IBMI's legislative franchise for another 25 years. The law granted IBMI a franchise to construct, install, operate, and maintain, for commercial purposes, radio broadcasting stations and television stations, including digital television system, with the corresponding facilities such as relay stations, throughout the Philippines. the law shall took effect on September 5, 2021.

Stations

Former stations

References

Philippine radio networks
Mass media companies established in 1996